"The Anthem" is a song by Pitbull, released as the second single from his 2007 album The Boatlift. It features crunk rapper Lil Jon. The intro line, as well as the song's main hook, is taken from the 1970s Latin hit "El Africano" by Sonora Dinamita. It samples the song "Calabria 2007" by Danish electronic music duo Enur.

"Defense" (official remix to "The Anthem")
The official remix is entitled "Defense (The Anthem)"; it features Trinidadian soca singer Machel Montano with Pitbull and Lil Jon. The remix appears on Montano's album Flame On (Winning Season is the U.S. edition of the album). This song is notable because its primary beat is played by a synthesized saxophone, which covers a simple minor triad.

Music video
The music video for the song was shot in Trinidad and Tobago, Miami and Atlanta and became a dedication to Natasja Saad.
E-40 made a cameo appearance.

Charts

References

2007 songs
2007 singles
2008 singles
Lil Jon songs
Pitbull (rapper) songs
Song recordings produced by Lil Jon
Songs written by Pitbull (rapper)
Songs written by Rune Reilly Kölsch
TVT Records singles